Edith Campion may refer to:
 Édith Cresson, née Campion, French politician
 Edith Campion (actress), New Zealand actor, writer, and a co-founder of the New Zealand Players theatre company